Events in the year 2014 in Hungary.

Incumbents
President – János Áder
Prime Minister – Viktor Orbán
Speaker – László Kövér

Events

March 
 28 March – Metro Line M4 is opened in Budapest

April 
 6 April – The 2014 Hungarian parliamentary election is held. Fidesz obtains a two-thirds majority in the National Assembly

May 
 25 May – 2014 European Parliament election in Hungary. Fidesz wins 12 out of the 21 seats.

October 
 12 October – The 2014 Hungarian local elections are held. István Tarlós (Fidesz) is reelected as Mayor of Budapest.

Deaths

 25 January – Gyula Sax, chess grandmaster
 31 January – Miklós Jancsó, film director
 4 April – Gyula Szabó, actor
 5 August – Angéla Németh, javelin thrower, Olympic champion
 6 August – Imre Bajor, actor and comedian

See also
List of Hungarian films since 1990

References

 
Hungary
Hungary
Years of the 21st century in Hungary
2010s in Hungary